The 2009 Copa Petrobras Montevideo was a professional tennis tournament played on outdoor red clay courts. It was the fifth edition of the tournament which was part of the 2009 ATP Challenger Tour. It took place in Montevideo, Uruguay between 5 and 11 October 2009.

Singles main draw entrants

Seeds

 Rankings are as of September 28, 2009.

Other entrants
The following players received wildcards into the singles main draw:
  Martín Cuevas
  Ramón Delgado
  Luis Horna
  Mariano Puerta

The following players received entry from the qualifying draw:
  Martín Alund
  Juan-Martín Aranguren
  Leandro Migani
  Leonardo Tavares

The following players received entry from Special Exempt draw:
  Gastón Gaudio

The following players received entry from Alternate draw:
  David Marrero

Champions

Singles

 Pablo Cuevas def.  Nicolás Lapentti, 7–5, 6–1

Doubles

 Juan Pablo Brzezicki /  David Marrero def.  Martín Cuevas /  Pablo Cuevas, 6–4, 6–4

External links
Official site of Copa Petrobras de Tênis
ITF Search 
2009 Draws

Copa Petrobras Montevideo
Clay court tennis tournaments
Tennis tournaments in Uruguay
Uruguay Open
2009 in Uruguayan tennis